Apurva Sarin (born 1 March 1962) is an Indian cell biologist and is presently Sr. Professor and  Director of Institute for Stem Cell Science and Regenerative Medicine (inStem), an Autonomous Institution under Department of Biotechnology, Govt. of India. Formerly, she was a professor at the National Centre for Biological Sciences. Known for her studies on the Mechanisms of apoptosis in metazoan cells, Sarin also serves as the dean of research at the Institute for Stem Cell Biology and Regenerative Medicine (inStem) and is an elected fellow of the Indian Academy of Sciences. An alumnus of the University of Delhi, she did her doctoral studies at the Jawaharlal Nehru University and the post-doctoral work at the National Cancer Institute of the National Institutes of Health. Her studies have been documented by way of a number of articles and the online article repository of the Indian Academy of Sciences has listed 44 of them. The Department of Biotechnology of the Government of India awarded her the National Bioscience Award for Career Development, one of the highest Indian science awards, for her contributions to biosciences in 2005.

Source: Pub Peer: Duplicate Image:

Notch4 Signaling Confers Susceptibility to TRAIL-Induced Apoptosis in Breast Cancer Cells
Journal of Cellular Biochemistry (2015) - 1 Comment
pubmed: 25704336  doi: 10.1002/jcb.25094  issn: 0730-2312  issn: 1097-4644 
Shambhavi Naik, Marion MacFarlane, Apurva Sarin

Figure 1.

The three flow cytometry panels representing T47D cells look similar to the three panels representing BT474 cells, albeit in a different order, with different gated percentages, and slight changes in the dots. Shown with boxes of the same color.
Could the authors please provide the originals?

Selected bibliography

See also 

 Programmed cell death
 Autophagy

Notes

References

Further reading

External links 
 
 https://www.instem.res.in/director-message
 https://www.instem.res.in/faculty/apurva

N-BIOS Prize recipients
Indian scientific authors
Living people
Fellows of the Indian Academy of Sciences
1962 births
Indian medical academics
Indian cell biologists
Scientists from Karnataka
Delhi University alumni
Jawaharlal Nehru University alumni
Academic staff of the National Centre for Biological Sciences